Raymond Beegle (born 1942) is an American piano accompanist and vocal chamber musician.

Early life and education 
Beegle was born in Los Angeles in 1942, and received a bachelor of arts degree from UCLA. He pursued graduate studies at the University of Southern California and the Vienna Academy of Music, and studied piano with Serge Tarnowsky, Aube Tserko, John Crown, and Kyriena Siloti. Winning first prize in the Los Angeles Bureau of Music's "Artists of the Future" vocal competition in 1962 made it possible for him to study the art of piano accompanying with Gwendolyn Koldofsky in Los Angeles, and Erik Werba in Vienna.

Career 
In 1961, Beegle began an association with the Gregg Smith Singers, performing in major festivals and concert series throughout the world, and participating in their recording projects for Columbia Records of the complete choral works of Charles Ives, "The Glory of Gabrieli," the complete choral works of Arnold Schönberg, and the "Stravinsky Conducts Stravinsky." series. As well he played for Smith's recordings of Irving Fine, Heinrich Schütz and Schubert, and appeared as accompanist for the Roger Wagner Chorale in the inaugural week celebration of the Los Angeles Music Center. He also appeared in the opening season of New York's Philharmonic Hall as accompanist for the Norman Luboff Choir.

In 1971 Raymond Beegle founded the New York Vocal Arts Ensemble, which for thirty-five years toured the world and recorded vocal chamber works by master composers of the 18th, 19th and 20th centuries. After winning first place in the Geneva International Music Competition by unanimous decision of the judges, the Ensemble appeared in major halls including Lincoln Center, Kennedy Center, Carnegie Hall, The Library of Congress, Dumbarton Oaks, Harvard, Princeton and Columbia Universities and the capitals of Europe and South America. Members of this ensemble have included John Aler, Jan Opalach, Mary Ann Hart, Paul Rowe, Lise Messier, Gregory Mercer, Wanda Brister, Judith Pannill, Jeffrey Flemming, Charles Robert Stephens, John Kramar and Jonathan Goodman.

Raymond Beegle has served as principal coach in the opera department of the University of Southern California; associate professor at the State University of New York at Stony Brook; and taught classes in vocal chamber music at the American Institute of Musical Studies in Graz where he was accompanist for Jennie Tourel's master classes. At UCLA and the Music Academy of the West he played for the classes of Martial Singher, and the students of Lotte Lehmann.

Television appearances include NBC Christmas special, which he hosted, scripted, and played for the Metropolitan Opera soprano, Theresa Zyllis-Gara, the Today Show, CBS Sunday Morning, and an interview with Charlie Rose.

As an ensemble player, he has performed under conductors including Igor Stravinsky, Robert Kraft, Lawrence Foster, Johannes Somari and Richard Westenburg, and collaborated with Licia Albanese, Zinka Milanov, Jennie Tourel, Marital Singher, James McCracken, Theresa Zyllis-Gara, and other notable singers.

He is currently on the faculty of Manhattan School of Music where for the past fifteen years he has given classes in
vocal chamber music and vocal accompanying.

Raymond Beegle was a contributing editor of The Opera Quarterly from 1989 to 2004, and for many years reviewed for
Fanfare Magazine, as well as the British journal, The Classic Record Collector. At present he is associate editor of Classical Voice.

Lawson Gould, Inc., Galaxy, and Walton Press publish his translations and edited editions of numerous choral and vocal chamber works.

Raymond Beegle has been a resident of New York City since 1970.

Notable Recordings

References

External links
 Manhattan School of Music
 Classical Voice

Living people
1942 births
Musicians from Los Angeles
University of California, Los Angeles alumni
University of Southern California alumni
Manhattan School of Music faculty
University of Music and Performing Arts Vienna alumni
20th-century American pianists
American male pianists
21st-century American pianists
20th-century American male musicians
21st-century American male musicians